Trenton/Mountain View Airport  is located  southeast of Mountain View, Ontario, Canada.

The airport serves as a Royal Canadian Air Cadets flying centre from May until October and as a flight training centre from June until the end of August each summer. Stored at Canadian Forces Detachment Mountain View, a geographically separated detachment of CFB Trenton located at the airport, are retired Royal Canadian Air Force (RCAF) aircraft. A dismantled de Havilland Canada CC-115 Buffalo is located here.

A new gravel runway (06L/24R) was constructed in 2006 to train RCAF Lockheed CC-130 Hercules aircraft crews in landing on unprepared landing strips.

See also
 CFD Mountain View

References

Military airbases in Ontario
Buildings and structures in Prince Edward County, Ontario